Felix Kadlinský (18 October 1613 in Horšovský Týn13 November 1675 in Uherské Hradiště) was a Baroque author, translator, and Jesuit from Bohemia.

1613 births
1675 deaths
17th-century Bohemian poets
Czech male poets
Czech Jesuits
Czech translators
People from Horšovský Týn
17th-century male writers
17th-century translators